Vix is a commune in the Vendée department in the Pays de la Loire region in western France.

Notable inhabitants
 Gaston Chaissac (1910–1964) a French painter

See also
Communes of the Vendée department

References

Communes of Vendée